The 1937 Coronation Honours were awarded in honour of the coronation of George VI.

Hereditary Peerage

Baron
 Brigadier General The Honourable Alexander Gore Arkwright, to be Baron Gowrie, of Canberra in the Commonwealth of Australia and of Dirleton in the County of East Lothian.

Baronet

 Robert -William Dalton, Esq., His Majesty's Senior Trade Commissioner in Australia.

Privy Council

 Brigadier General The Honourable Alexander Gore Arkwright,  - Governor-General of Australia

Knight Bachelor

Robert William Chapman, Esq., Professor of Engineering, University of Adelaide, State of South Australia. For public services.
William James Clemens, Esq., Commissioner, Public Service Board, Commonwealth of Australia.
Major the Honourable Henry Alan Currie, Member of the Legislative Council, State of Victoria. For public services.
Robert William Dalton, Esq., His Majesty's Senior Trade Commissioner in Australia.
James Wallace Sandford, Esq. For public services in the Commonwealth of Australia.
The Honourable Alexander George Wales, J.P., Lord Mayor of the City of Melbourne, State of Victoria.

Most Honourable Order of the Bath

Knight Grand Cross of the Order of the Bath (GCB)
 Sir Isaac Alfred Isaacs,  - former Governor-General of Australia

Most Distinguished Order of St Michael and St George

Knight Grand Cross of the Order of St Michael and St George (GCMG)
Sir Robert Randolph Garran, . For public services in the Commonwealth of Australia.

Knight Commander of the Order of St Michael and St George (KCMG)
The Honourable Sir Frederick Wollaston Mann – Lieutenant-Governor and Chief Justice of the State of Victoria.

Companion of the Order of St Michael and St George (CMG)
Edgar Layton Bean, Esq., Parliamentary Draftsman, State of South Australia.
Kingsley Anketell Henderson, Esq., For public services in the Commonwealth of Australia.
Lieutenant-Colonel the Honourable George Victor Lansell, Member of the Legislative Council, State of Victoria. For public and social welfare services.
Arthur Edgar Leighton, Esq., Controller-General of Munitions Supply, Commonwealth of Australia.
James Francis Murphy, Esq., Secretary, Department of Commerce, Commonwealth of Australia.

Most Excellent Order of the British Empire

Dame Grand Cross of the Order of the British Empire (GBE)
Civil Division
Enid Muriel, Mrs. Lyons. For public services rendered in the Commonwealth of Australia.

Knight Commander of the Order of the British Empire (KBE)
Civil Division
The Honourable John Richards Harris, Minister of Public Instruction and Minister of Public Health, State of Victoria.
John Sanderson, Esq. For services to the Commonwealth of Australia.

Commander of the Order of the British Empire (CBE)
Military Division
 Lieutenant-Colonel George Frederick Gardells Wieck, Australian Staff Corps, Deputy Assistant Adjutant and Quarter Master - General, 5th Military District, Australian Military Forces.
 Honorary Lieutenant and Temporary QuarterMaster Herbert Percy. Lawrence, Australian Instructional Corps, Australian Military Forces.
 Honorary Major and Quarter-Master Walter Reginald Olifent, Australian Instructional Corps, Australian Military Forces.
 Group Captain Adrian Trevor Cole, Royal Australian Air Force.

Civil Division
George Stanley Colman, Member, Pastoral Research Council, Commonwealth of Australia.
Jessie Isabel, Mrs. Henderson. For social welfare services in the State of Victoria.
Raymond Douglas Huish, For services to ex-servicemen in the Commonwealth of Australia.
James Perrins Major, Esq., Honorary Secretary of the Branch in the State of Victoria of the British Medical Association.
Robert Fitzroy Sanderson, Member of the Federal Advisory Committee on Eastern Trade, Commonwealth of Australia.

Officer of the Order of the British Empire (OBE)
Military Division
 Squadron Leader George John William Mackinolty, Royal Australian Air Force.

Civil Division
 Joseph Procter Bainbridge, Esq., Registrar of the University of Melbourne, State of Victoria.
 Kate Baker. For literary services in the Commonwealth of Australia.
 Harry James Burrell, Esq., For contributions to natural history in the Commonwealth of Australia.
 The Reverend Canon Robert Brodribb Stewart. Hammond. For social welfare services in the Commonwealth of Australia.
 Charles Royden Laraghy, Esq., Secretary, Limbless Soldiers' Association, Commonwealth of Australia.
 Professor Arthur James Perkins, formerly Director of Agriculture in the State of South Australia.
 Stanley Wesley Perry, Esq. For social welfare services in the Commonwealth of Australia.
 Charles Ernest Prell, Esq., a prominent grazier in the Commonwealth of Australia. For public services.
 Lawrence Wells, Esq. For public services in the State of South Australia.

Member of the Order of the British Empire (MBE)
Civil Division
 Elizabeth Ann, Mrs. Alphen. For social welfare services in the Commonwealth of Australia.
 Joseph Maxwell Bauman, Esq. For services to ex-service men and their dependents in the Commonwealth of Australia
 Edmund Albert James Benjafield, Esq., Collector of Customs (Tasmania), Department of Trade and Customs, Commonwealth of Australia.
 Edwin Alexander Black, Esq., formerly Deputy Commissioner of Taxation (Western Australia), Department .of the Treasury, Commonwealth of Australia.
 Charles Henry Brown, Esq., Representative in Western Australia of the Public Service Board, Commonwealth of Australia.
 Walter Enves, Esq., Station Master, Victoria, Southern Railway Company.
 Arthur George Harston, Esq. For services to disabled ex-service men in the Commonwealth of Australia
 Helen, Mrs. Marina. For charitable services in the Commonwealth of Australia
 William McPherson, Esq., formerly Deputy Commissioner of Invalid and Old Age Pensions (Victoria), Department of the Treasury, Commonwealth of Australia.
 Blanche, Mrs. O'Loghlin. For social welfare services in the State of South Australia
 Millicent Frances Dora Ritchie, Honorary Secretary, Braille Association, Commonwealth of Australia
 Pearl Ernestine, Mrs. Stow, Organising Secretary of the Junior Red Cross Organisation in the State of South Australia.
 Lieutenant-Colonel Leonard Rhys Thomas, Manager of the Australian Broadcasting Commission's Station at Hobart, State of Tasmania.
 Mary, Mrs. Warnes, President of the Country Women's Association in the State of South Australia.

Imperial Service Order

Companion of the Imperial Service Order (ISO)
 Charles Buxton Anderson, Esq., Railways Commissioner for the State of South Australia.
 Peter Kennedy, Esq., Superintending Engineer (South Australia), Postmaster-General's Department, Commonwealth of Australia.
 Alexander Llewellyn Read, Esq., Under-Secretary and Clerk of the Executive Council, State of South Australia.
 Richard Harold Reeves, Esq., Secretary and Chief Inspector, Auditor-General's Office, Commonwealth of Australia
 Bernhard Wallach, Esq., Commissioner of Patents, Registrar of Trade Marks, Copyrights and Designs, Attorney-General's Department, Commonwealth of Australia

Imperial Service Medal

 Birmingham, Michael Patrick, Overseer, Mail Branch, Postmaster-General's Department, Victoria.
 Larimer, Frederick Hugh, Overseer, Grade 2, Mail Branch, Postmaster-General's Department, Western Australia.

British Empire Medal (BEM)

 Alick Alfred Fleet, Sergeant Instructor, South Australian Police Force.
 Peter King, Foreman Driver, Government Motor Garage, South Australia

References

1937 awards
Orders, decorations, and medals of Australia